In music, Op. 128 stands for Opus number 128. Compositions that are assigned this number include:
 Reger – Vier Tondichtungen nach A. Böcklin
 Saint-Saëns – The Assassination of the Duke of Guise
 Schumann – Julius Caesar